Efrenk River  (also called Suntras or Arslanlöy River in the upper reaches and Müftü River in the lower reaches) is a short river in Mersin Province, Turkey. It was originally called Efrenk River. After a mosque named Müftü Mosque was built by the river in Mersin, it was popularly renamed Müftü River.

Geography

The headwaters are in the Toros Mountains, near the town of Arslanköy and the village of Atlılar (Sadiye). In fact the river is the borderline between the second level municipalities of Mersin;  Yenişehir is to the west and Akdeniz and Toroslar are to the east of the river. There are five bridges within Mersin and one on the Çukurova motorway just north of the city.

Hydrology

The drainage basin is only  in area. Thus the river flows fast. Like the other locations of the Mediterranean Region annual precipitation is mostly in the spring and the winter. So the flow rate is highly irregular depending on the season. While the average flow rate is quite low, 303 m3/s (10700 ft3/s) had been recorded during the flood of 2001.

Arslanköy pond

Arslanköy Pond is an artificial pond on the upper reaches of the river. The storage capacity is 1.3 hm3 (1.7·106yd3) and the total irrigation area is about 1.51 km2 (0.69 mi2).

References

Rivers of Turkey
Rivers of Mersin Province